Professor Breda Smyth is an Irish public health specialist who has served as Chief Medical Officer of Ireland since October 2022, having previously held the position on an interim basis. She is the first woman to hold the post. She previously was professor for public health medicine in NUI Galway and a consultant in public health in HSE West.

Medical career
Smyth completed her primary degree in medicine (MB, BCh, BAO) in University College Galway. She then continued her training in the Royal College of Physicians of Ireland (RCPI), undertook a Masters in Public Health in University College Dublin, a Medical Doctorate in NUI Galway and a post-doctoral fellowship in the University of California, Los Angeles. Smyth was conferred as a member of the Faculty of Public Health Medicine of Ireland in 2005, and, in 2013, was made a fellow of the Faculty of Public Health Medicine in Ireland.

Smyth has extensive experience leading national programmes across public health. She was a senior responsible owner on the HSE Public Health Reform programme in 2019. She was the national lead on the Health and Positive Ageing Project and she developed and published the "Healthy and Positive Ageing for All; Research Strategy 2015 – 2019" in collaboration with the Department of Health in 2019. She was also the national stroke prevention lead in the Stroke Clinical Programme 2010 to 2014 leading the pilot opportunistic screening for atrial fibrillation.

Throughout the COVID-19 pandemic, Smyth contributed significantly as a member of the National Public Health Emergency Team (NPHET), the Rapid Testing Expert Advisory Group and as a founding member of the COVID-19 Irish Epidemiological Modelling Advisory Group.

On 15 June 2022, Minister for Health Stephen Donnelly appointed Smyth as Chief Medical Officer of Ireland on an interim basis from 4 July until a permanent successor was appointed, following the retirement of Dr Tony Holohan.

On 5 October 2022, it was announced that Professor Smyth would take over as full time Chief Medical Officer, becoming the first woman to hold the post.

Musical career
Surrounded by a strong family tradition of Irish music, Smyth plays the fiddle and tin whistle. She and her sister Cora began playing music from a young age and have collectively won over forty All-Ireland titles.

Smyth has toured and performed worldwide as a violinist with Michael Flatley's Lord of the Dance and Feet of Flames which included performances at the Ryder Cup and the Red Cross for the Royal Family in Monaco.

She released her debut album Basil and Thyme in 2002 and was subsequently nominated as female traditional musician of the year by the Irish Music Magazine in 2003. She hosted the Irish Music Magazine Awards in the National Concert Hall, Dublin in October 2003.

Personal life
Smyth is from Straide, County Mayo. She has three siblings, Cora, Maria and Sean. Smyth is married to Jimmy Higgins, a percussionist, and together they have two children, Blathnaid and Donal.

Selected publications

References

Year of birth missing (living people)
Living people
Alumni of the University of Galway
Department of Health (Ireland)
Health in the Republic of Ireland
Members of the Royal College of Physicians of Ireland
21st-century women physicians